Philip Ellis (born 9 October 1992) is a Swiss-British-German racing driver. He is currently competing for HTP Motorsport in the IMSA SportsCar Championship, having previously competed in the DTM for the same team.

Career
In 2011, Ellis won the Formula Lista Junior, a championship grouping together Formula BMWs, with the GU-Racing team. In 2012, he took part in the 2012 Formula 3 Euro Series as well as the 2012 FIA Formula 3 European Championship, still with GU Racing, he was aiming for the place of best beginner. In 2017, he won the Audi Sport TT Cup. The series was cancelled in 2018, thus making Ellis the final TT Cup champion.

Ellis competed in the 2021 Deutsche Tourenwagen Masters alongside Lucas Auer. He drove for HTP Winward Motorsport. He returned to the GT World Challenge Europe Endurance Cup for a full season campaign in 2023, joining Indy Dontje and Russell Ward in the Gold Cup class.

Racing record

Career summary

‡ Team standings.

Complete Deutsche Tourenwagen Masters results 
(key) (Races in bold indicate pole position) (Races in italics indicate fastest lap)

Complete WeatherTech SportsCar Championship results
(key) (Races in bold indicate pole position; results in italics indicate fastest lap)

References

External links
 

1992 births
Living people
Sportspeople from Munich
Swiss racing drivers
British racing drivers
German racing drivers
Racing drivers from Bavaria
Deutsche Tourenwagen Masters drivers
GT World Challenge America drivers
WeatherTech SportsCar Championship drivers
ADAC GT Masters drivers
Nürburgring 24 Hours drivers
Formula Lista Junior drivers
Audi Sport TT Cup drivers
FIA Formula 3 European Championship drivers
Formula 3 Euro Series drivers
Mercedes-AMG Motorsport drivers
Phoenix Racing drivers
Michelin Pilot Challenge drivers
24H Series drivers
Craft-Bamboo Racing drivers